Calin Calaidjoglu (born 18 January 2001) is a footballer who plays as a midfielder for Sfîntul Gheorghe. Born in Moldova, he was a Canada youth international.

Career

In 2019, he signed for French sixth tier side Cholet B. In 2020, Calaidjoglu signed for Béziers in the French fourth tier. Before the second half of 2021–22, he signed for Moldovan club Sfîntul Gheorghe. On 19 March 2022, he debuted for Sfîntul Gheorghe during a 0–3 loss to Sheriff.

References

External links
 

2001 births
AS Béziers (2007) players
Association football midfielders
Canadian expatriate soccer players
Canadian expatriate sportspeople in France
Canadian soccer players
Expatriate footballers in France
FC Sfîntul Gheorghe players
Living people
Moldova youth international footballers
Moldovan expatriate footballers
Moldovan expatriate sportspeople in France
Moldovan footballers
Moldovan Super Liga players
Footballers from Chișinău